Prince George's Chapel is a historic Episcopal chapel of ease located near Dagsboro, Sussex County, Delaware.  It was built in 1755 as a chapel-of-ease for St. Martin's Church, Worcester Parish, Maryland. Churches built to serve the outlying areas of a parish where it was difficult for people to travel to the main church were given a chapel-of-ease designation. On June 30, 1757, the completed chapel was received by the vestry, dedicated, and named "Prince George's Chapel" for England's Prince George, later  George III of the United Kingdom. It is a small, shingled structure. A transept and chancel were added about 1763, but these have been removed.  The interior features a vaulted ceiling of heart-pine, timbered pine pillars.  The State of Delaware purchased the property in 1967 and renovated the building.

The site was added to the National Register of Historic Places in 1971.

Notable burials in church's cemetery
General John Dagworthy, namesake of Dagsboro, Revolutionary War veteran

References

External links
 Sussex County Online: Prince George's Chapel, Dagsboro, Delaware

Episcopal church buildings in Delaware
Properties of religious function on the National Register of Historic Places in Delaware
Churches completed in 1757
Churches in Sussex County, Delaware
18th-century Episcopal church buildings
Historic American Buildings Survey in Delaware
National Register of Historic Places in Sussex County, Delaware
Episcopal chapels in the United States